Sunfix Glacier is a tributary glacier, 15 nautical miles (28 km) long and 2 nautical miles (3.7 km) wide, draining east-northeast between Grimley Glacier and Lurabee Glacier into Casey Glacier, in northern Palmer Land, Antarctica. Photographed from the air by Ronne Antarctic Research Expedition (RARE) on December 22, 1947. Surveyed by Falkland Islands Dependencies Survey (FIDS) in November 1960. The name derives from the important sun fix for latitude which was observed by FIDS at the head of this glacier, an area where cloud seldom allows such observation.

Glaciers of Palmer Land